Mike de Kock (born February 14, 1964) is a South African racehorse trainer. He currently holds the South African record for most Grade 1 wins by a trainer with 133. He has trained over 3,400 winners who have won in South Africa, UAE, Hong Kong, Singapore, United Kingdom and the USA.

De Kock has been champion trainer 8 times. In his career he has trained 133 Grade 1 winners, 148 Grade 2 winners, and 98 Grade 3 winners.

Awards

Mike de Dock has been awarded Champion Trainer of South Africa at the annual Equus Awards on seven occasions.

Grade 1 Winners

A list of all the Grade 1 winners trained by Mike de Kock.

De Kock holds the record for the most Grade 1 Summer Cup victories with nine wins (three of them when the race was known as the Champion Stakes).

References

South African racehorse owners and breeders
1964 births
Living people